The bibliography of Socrates comprises works about the ancient Greek philosopher Socrates.

Biographies 

 The Hemlock Cup (2011) by Bettany Hughes

Compendia

Other 

 Aristotle's Dialogue with Socrates: On the Nicomachean Ethics (2008) by Ronna Burger
 Socratic Citizenship (2001) by Dana Villa

Theses 

 On the Concept of Irony with Continual Reference to Socrates (1841) by Søren Kierkegaard

References 

 
Socrates